Serhiy Valentynovych Puchkov (born 17 April 1962) is a former midfielder and manager.

Career
He is a former head-coach of Metalurh Zaporizhzhia in the Ukrainian Premier League.

He is married and has two sons and a daughter.

Honours

Player
 Soviet Top League Champion: 1988
 USSR Cup:  1989

Coach
 Ukrainian Cup: Ukrainian Cup 2009–10

External links
 Biography  
 Profile at Official FFU Site (Ukr)

1962 births
Living people
Soviet footballers
Ukrainian footballers
Ukrainian football managers
Soviet Top League players
Russian Premier League players
FC Volyn Lutsk players
SC Odesa players
FC Dnipro players
FC Chornomorets Odesa players
FC Metalurh Zaporizhzhia players
FC KAMAZ Naberezhnye Chelny players
Hapoel Be'er Sheva F.C. players
MFC Mykolaiv players
Ukrainian expatriate footballers
Expatriate footballers in Germany
Expatriate footballers in Israel
Expatriate footballers in Russia
Expatriate footballers in Azerbaijan
Ukrainian Premier League managers
MFC Mykolaiv managers
FC Dnipro Cherkasy managers
FC Cherkashchyna managers
FC Krystal Kherson managers
FC Sevastopol managers
SC Tavriya Simferopol managers
Ukrainian expatriate football managers
Expatriate football managers in Armenia
FC Gandzasar Kapan managers
Ukrainian expatriate sportspeople in Germany
Ukrainian expatriate sportspeople in Israel
Ukrainian expatriate sportspeople in Russia
Ukrainian expatriate sportspeople in Azerbaijan
Ukrainian expatriate sportspeople in Armenia
Association football defenders
FC Hirnyk-Sport Horishni Plavni managers
Sportspeople from Luhansk Oblast